.
Group 3J Improved Production Cars is an Australian motor racing category for modified road cars.
 
The category is defined by the Confederation of Australian Motor Sport (CAMS) as being for race vehicles derived from registered production automobiles, with limited modifications to improve performance and reliability. Cars must be mass-produced touring cars, the model of which has been:
  homologated by the FIA in Group A or
  commercially available in Australia as a new car through a manufacturer’s dealer network, with at least 200 examples having been registered for road use in Australia or
  otherwise recognised by CAMS for Group 3J

Modifications to engines, brakes and suspension are permitted and a different engine, from the same manufacturer as the body shell, may be utilised. Cars may be fitted with wheel arch flares, front air dams and rear deck spoilers.

Improved Production Cars compete in one of four of engine capacity classes: 
 0 - 1600 cc
 1600 - 2000 cc
 2000 - 3000 cc
 3000 - 6000 cc

The Improved Production Racing Association of Australia (IPRA) is recognised by CAMS as the sole entity representing competitors in the category. State championships are conducted in every Australian State and the Northern Territory and the Australian Improved Production Nationals are held annually on a state rotational basis.

The category was formerly known as 3J Club Cars. The name Group 3J Club Cars was used up to the year 2000, and Group 3J Improved Production Cars from 2001.

Australian Improved Production Nationals

Note: The title was contested as the Club Car Nationals prior to 2001.

References

External links
 [www.ipranationals.com www.ipranationals.com]

Motorsport categories in Australia